Zhai Biao (born 14 September 1968) is a Chinese football manager and a former international midfielder. As a player he represented Beijing and Sichuang Quanxing while internationally he played for China in the 1988 Asian Cup. After retiring as a player he moved into management where he coached Sichuan F.C.

Career statistics

International statistics

References

External links
 
 Team China Stats

1968 births
Living people
Chinese footballers
Footballers from Beijing
China international footballers
Beijing Guoan F.C. players
Sichuan Guancheng players
1988 AFC Asian Cup players
Association football midfielders
Sichuan Jiuniu F.C. managers
Beijing Guoan F.C. non-playing staff